Kohat Division is one of seven divisions in Pakistan's Khyber Pakhtunkhwa province. It consists of five districts: Hangu, Karak, Kohat, Kurram, and Orakzai. According to the 2017 Pakistani Census, the division had a population of 3,211,458, making it the third-least populous division in the province, and it spans  of area, and this makes it the fourth-largest division by area in the province. Kohat is the division's largest city and namesake, with over 220,000 inhabitants. The division borders Bannu Division to the south and west, Peshawar Division to the north and east, the province of Punjab, Pakistan to its east, and the country of Afghanistan to its northwest.

Districts

Districts are the administrative unit one level below divisions in the administrative hierarchy of Pakistan. Kohat Division consists of the following five districts:

History 

In 1941, the area which today covers the division (excluding Orakzai and Kurram) was known as Kohat District. Kohat District was one of five trans-Indus districts in the North-West Frontier Province of British India. It was split into the Tehsils of Hangu, Kohat, and Teri. Here is a description of the area given by the Imperial Gazetteer of India.

Kurram, on the other hand, was an agency in the province bordering Kohat District. It is also described in the Gazetteer.

At that time, the area that would later become Orakzai District was an unadministered patch of land known as Tīrāh. Its description is below.

At the time of the One Unit policy, Kohat District became a part of the then-much-larger Peshawar Division. When the policy ended, though, Kohat District stayed in the division.

The area received full-fledged division status between the Pakistani censuses of 1981 and 1998, and during the same time period, Hangu Tehsil and Karak Tehsil (formerly Teri Tehsil) were also upgraded, to district status (becoming Hangu District and Lakki Marwat District).

In August 2000, Kohat Division was abolished along with every other division in the country, but was reinstated (with all the other divisions of Pakistan) eight years later after the elections of 2008.

In 2018, the 25th Amendment to the Constitution of Pakistan was passed by the Parliament of Pakistan and the Khyber Pakhtunkhwa Assembly. This entirely and fully merged the seven agencies of the Federally Administered Tribal Areas and the six Frontier Regions with the province of Khyber Pakhtunkhwa. With this merger, Kohat Division gained the agencies of Kurram and Orakzai, which became districts, and the Frontier Region Kohat (which was fully merged into Kohat District as Darra Adam Khel Subdivision).

Geography 

Together they make up about 55% of the area of the division. The two smaller districts of the division, Hangu (with an area of only ) and Orakzai (with an area of ) make up the interior of the division, wedged between the three larger districts to their west and east.

The important Kurram River (a major tributary of the Indus River) begins in this division, in Kurram District.

Surrounding areas 

To Kohat Division's northeast, you will find Peshawar Division, to the division's southwest, Bannu Division can be found. To the southeast of Kohat Division, the divisions of Sargodha and Rawalpindi in the province of Punjab can be found, and Kohat Division borders the country of Afghanistan to its northwest.

Demographics 

As of the 2017 Census of Pakistan, the division had a population of 3,211,458, out of which there were 1,591,494 males, 1,619,908 females, and 57 people who identified as Transgender; this made the sex ratio of the division 982 males for every 1,000 females, and makes it very unique among the divisions of Pakistan and across all of South Asia, as in most of Pakistan and South Asia, males are the majority. The division had 355,594 households, making the average household size of the division 9.03, one of the highest in Pakistan; 463,732 people in the division lived in an urban area, but the majority (2,747,726) lived in a rural area, making the urbanization rate of the division a 14.43%, far below the national average Geographically, it is the fourth-largest division in the province of Khyber Pakhtunkhwa, and has the fifth-largest (or third-smallest) population.

Kohat Division had nine urbanized municipalities in 2017. Their names were (ordered by population) Kohat, Karak, Hangu, Sadda, Tall, Lachi, Doaba, Shakardara, and Parachinar. Kohat, the division's namesake and largest city, is situated in Kohat District and has over 200,000 inhabitants. Kohat is Khyber Pakhtunkhwa's fourth-largest city and is a fast-growing city whose population grew at a rate of more than 3% every year between 1998 and 2017. Karak, Kohat Division's third-largest city, is the largest city and namesake of Karak District. Having a population just over 50,000, it is Khyber Pakhtunkhwa's 24th largest city. Hangu, Kohat Division's second-largest city, is the largest city and namesake of Hangu District. Having a population just under 50,000, it is Khyber Pakhtunkhwa's 27th largest city. In 1998, Hangu was larger than Karak, but due to Karak's fast growth, has been overtaken. Sadda, in Kurram District, is the fourth-largest city in Kohat Division, with about 35,000 inhabitants. It was the second-largest city in the now-defunct Federally Administered Tribal Areas and is the 40th largest city in the province of Khyber Pakhtunkhwa. It is a fast-growing city (with a population growth rate of 3.75% every year between 1998 and 2017, which means its population more than doubled during that period) and is more than six times larger than Parachinar, Kurram District's administrative district capital. Orakzai District is the only district in the division without a single urbanized area. It is entirely rural.

The division has one cantonment, the Kohat Cantonment, adjacent to the city of Kohat which had a population of 36,935, making up the division's entire military population. This made 1.15% of the entire population of the division active military personnel.

In 1998, the dominant language in the division was Pashto, with over 90% of the population speaking it as their mother tongue. Punjabi is spoken by about 1% of the population, and Urdu and Saraiki are spoken by about 0.35% and 0.3% of the population respectively. Of the remaining 5% of the population, most are suspected to speak the Kohati dialect of Hindko (a language for which official statistics were not collected in 1998), which was predominant in urban Kohat more than a century ago.

See also 
 Divisions of Khyber Pakhtunkhwa
 Kohat District
 Kohat
 Kohati

Notes 
A.  Before 2018, the Kurram Agency (now Kurram District), the Orakzai Agency (now Orakzai District), and the Frontier Region Kohat were not a part of Kohat Division, but were a part of the Federally Administered Tribal Areas, then outside Khyber Pakhtunkhwa.

B.  There were only three constituencies solely inside Kohat Division at the time of the 2018 Pakistani general election, but there was a fourth constituency, NA-51, that was made of regions from different divisions. NA-51 covered the Frontier Region Kohat in Kohat Division, but the area only makes up 33.15% of the population of the constituency and 3.69% of the population of the division, so it is omitted in the infobox. That seat was won by Muttahida Majlis-e-Amal.

C.  At the time of the 2018 Pakistani general election, Kohat District sent three representatives to the KPK Assembly and Hangu District and Karak District sent two each, but elections were held a year later (in 2019) in the areas of Khyber Pakhtunkhwa that were formerly part of the Federally Administered Tribal Areas. At the time of the 2019 elections, Kurram District elected two representatives, and Orakzai District elected one representative, which add up to ten for the entire division. Once again, though, there was another constituency, PK-115, that was made of regions from different divisions. PK-115 (just like NA-51) covered the Frontier Region Kohat in Kohat Division, but the area only makes up 33.15% of the population of the constituency and 3.69% of the population of the division, so it is omitted in the infobox. The seat was won by Jamiat Ulema-e-Islam (F).

References

Divisions of Khyber Pakhtunkhwa